Taylor Townsend was the defending champion, having won the event in 2012, but chose not to participate.

Ana Konjuh won the tournament, defeating Kateřina Siniaková in the final, 6–3, 6–4.

Seeds

Qualifiers

Main draw

Finals

Top half

Section 1

Section 2

Bottom half

Section 3

Section 4

References

External links 
 Main draw

Girls' Singles
Australian Open, 2013 Girls' Singles